Mountain View is a census designated place (CDP) in Contra Costa County, California, United States. The population was 2,372 at the 2010 census.

Geography
According to the United States Census Bureau, the CDP has a total area of 0.3 square miles (0.75 km), all of it land.

Demographics

2010
The 2010 United States Census reported that Mountain View had a population of 2,372. The racial makeup of Mountain View was 1,896 (79.9%) White, 60 (2.5%) African American, 30 (1.3%) Native American, 70 (3.0%) Asian, 20 (0.8%) Pacific Islander, 155 (6.5%) from other races, and 141 (5.9%) from two or more races. Hispanic or Latino of any race were 524 persons (22.1%).

The Census reported that 2,344 people (98.8% of the population) lived in households, 28 (1.2%) lived in non-institutionalized group quarters, and 0 (0%) were institutionalized.

There were 939 households, out of which 295 (31.4%) had children under the age of 18 living in them, 369 (39.3%) were opposite-sex married couples living together, 138 (14.7%) had a female householder with no husband present, 71 (7.6%) had a male householder with no wife present.  There were 89 (9.5%) unmarried opposite-sex partnerships, and 11 (1.2%) same-sex married couples or partnerships. 241 households (25.7%) were made up of individuals, and 44 (4.7%) had someone living alone who was 65 years of age or older. The average household size was 2.50.  There were 578 families (61.6% of all households); the average family size was 2.99.

The population was spread out, with 480 people (20.2%) under the age of 18, 253 people (10.7%) aged 18 to 24, 708 people (29.8%) aged 25 to 44, 749 people (31.6%) aged 45 to 64, and 182 people (7.7%) who were 65 years of age or older.  The median age was 36.5 years. For every 100 females, there were 99.8 males.  For every 100 females age 18 and over, there were 102.1 males.

The homeowner vacancy rate was 3.9%; the rental vacancy rate was 6.6%.  1,446 people (61.0% of the population) lived in owner-occupied housing units and 898 people (37.9%) lived in rental housing units.

2000
As of the census of 2000, there were 2,468 people, 959 households, and 589 families residing in the CDP. The racial makeup of the CDP was 84.00% White, 2.07% Black or African American, 1.30% Native American, 2.23% Asian, 0.28% Pacific Islander, 4.74% from other races, and 5.39% from two or more races.  14.51% of the population were Hispanic or Latino of any race.

There were 959 households, out of which 35.3% had children under the age of 18 living with them, 40.0% were married couples living together, 14.8% had a female householder with no husband present, and 38.5% were non-families. 27.3% of all households were made up of individuals, and 6.5% had someone living alone who was 65 years of age or older.  The average household size was 2.53 and the average family size was 3.07.

In the CDP, the population was spread out, with 26.3% under the age of 18, 8.3% from 18 to 24, 37.0% from 25 to 44, 20.7% from 45 to 64, and 7.8% who were 65 years of age or older.  The median age was 35 years. For every 100 females, there were 97.1 males.  For every 100 females age 18 and over, there were 98.9 males.

The median income for a household in the CDP was $51,986, and the median income for a family was $52,857. Males had a median income of $42,685 versus $34,583 for females. The per capita income for the CDP was $26,071.  About 5.4% of families and 8.5% of the population were below the poverty line, including 3.6% of those under age 18 and 13.6% of those age 65 or over.

References

Census-designated places in Contra Costa County, California
Census-designated places in California